Nathan Laszewski (born July 19, 1999) is an American college basketball player for the Notre Dame Fighting Irish of the Atlantic Coast Conference (ACC).

High school career
Laszewski played basketball for Avon High School in Avon, Connecticut, where he earned First Team All-State honors. He transferred to Northfield Mount Hermon School in Gill, Massachusetts. As a sophomore, Laszewski led his team to the New England Preparatory School Athletic Council (NEPSAC) Class AAA title and was named MVP. In his final season, Laszewski helped his team to a school-record 31 wins and another Class AAA title, where he won MVP. He averaged 19.6 points, 6.8 rebounds and 1.9 assists per game per game, and set program records for single-season points and three-pointers, as well as career three-pointers.  A consensus four-star recruit, he committed to play college basketball for Notre Dame over offers from Arizona, North Carolina, Wake Forest and Wisconsin.

College career
As a freshman at Notre Dame, Laszewski averaged 6.9 points and 3.9 rebounds per game. In his sophomore season, he averaged 7.4 points and 4.6 rebounds per game. On December 30, 2020, Laszewski posted a career-high 28 points and six rebounds in a 66–57 loss to Virginia. As a junior, he averaged 13.3 points and 7.3 rebounds per game, earning All-Atlantic Coast Conference (ACC) honorable mention.

Career statistics

College

|-
| style="text-align:left;"| 2018–19
| style="text-align:left;"| Notre Dame
| 33 || 7 || 19.0 || .392 || .338 || .720 || 3.9 || .2 || .2 || .4 || 6.9
|-
| style="text-align:left;"| 2019–20
| style="text-align:left;"| Notre Dame
| 32 || 1 || 21.0 || .410 || .310 || .731 || 4.6 || .5 || .2 || .3 || 7.4
|-
| style="text-align:left;"| 2020–21
| style="text-align:left;"| Notre Dame
| 26 || 25 || 31.3 || .589 || .434 || .710 || 7.3 || .8 || .5 || .6 || 13.3
|- class="sortbottom"
| style="text-align:center;" colspan="2"| Career
| 91 || 33 || 23.2 || .466 || .351 || .718 || 5.1 || .5 || .3 || .4 || 8.9

Personal life
Laszewski's father, Jay, and his older sister, Abby, played college basketball at Wisconsin. His younger sister, Emma, plays college basketball for Brown. He and his family lived in Belgium and Australia for parts of his childhood.

References

External links
Notre Dame Fighting Irish bio

1999 births
Living people
American men's basketball players
Basketball players from Florida
People from Jupiter, Florida
Power forwards (basketball)
Notre Dame Fighting Irish men's basketball players
Northfield Mount Hermon School alumni